The Bath Unmasked is a 1725 comedy play by the British writer Gabriel Odingsells. The action takes place in the fashionable spa town of Bath.

Staged at the Lincoln's Inn Fields Theatre in London it lasted for six performances, considered a reasonable run for a comedy at the time. The original cast included Lacy Ryan as Sprightly, Anthony Boheme as Wiseman, John Egleton as Pander, John Hippisley as Sir Captious, Richard Diggs as Sharper, Jane Egleton as Lady Ambsace, Jane Rogers as Liberia, Henrietta Morgan as Tippet, Anne Parker as Cleora and Thomas Walker as Frippou.

References

Bibliography
 Brown, Laura. Homeless Dogs & Melancholy Apes: Humans and Other Animals in the Modern Literary Imagination. Cornell University Press, 2010.
 Burling, William J. A Checklist of New Plays and Entertainments on the London Stage, 1700-1737. Fairleigh Dickinson Univ Press, 1992.
 Nicoll, Allardyce. A History of Early Eighteenth Century Drama: 1700-1750. CUP Archive, 1927.

1725 plays
British plays
West End plays
Comedy plays